Discover Korea is a non-profit corporation affiliated with Gyeonggi Provice's foreign policy, established in 2020.

With Sang-jin Oh as chair and Seokho Daniel Yoon as a secretary general, Discover Korea's vision is to promote the culture and status of Korea overseas and revitalize the communication culture. Discover Korea is a expansion of a non-profit organization Debate Korea, currently an subsidiary group for Discover Korea.

Discover Korea has participated in both 2019 and 2020 WUDC to attract participants for Korea WUDC 2021.In South Africa Capetown WUDC 2019 and held an booth event where participants could experience Korean food and traditional clothes. In following Thailand Bangkok WUDC 2020, by organizing Korean Night event where such as writing names in Korean and tasting Korean food.

Recently, Discover Korea sponsored and supported the selection of the International Economic Olympiad Korea national team.

Debate Korea 

Debate Korea (also referred as DK), non-profit organization under the non-profit corporation Discovey Korea, was established in 2016 to expand the Republic of Korea's domestic communication culture. Seokho Daniel Yoon, the first Ivy League coach in Korea, and Sang-jin Oh, a former announcer and current broadcaster of Korea, established Debate Korea to spread a culture of communication that allows young people to exchange various opinions to Korea and the world.

Since its establishment, Debate Korea has run debate competitions and professional educational programs such as 'World Universities Debating Championship(WUDC)’ and the ‘2021 Seoul Youth Policy Debate’ in the Korean language, the international debate competition ‘Debate Korea Open(DKO)’, ‘Cornell-Yonsei English Debate Middle and High School Competition(CYDI)’as a process of their mission spread a culture of communication that allows young people to exchange various opinions in cooperation with major institutions and companies at home and abroad to Korea and even the world.

Since the establishment of the Debate Korea, the promotion of Korean culture has been actively carried out in the U.S., South Africa, Thailand, and Vietnam due to the hosting of WUDC, therefore in 2020,it has expanded to Discover Korea, a non-profit corporation affiliated with Gyeonggi Provice's foreign policy, to revitalize communication, public diplomacy and exchanges among young people around the world. Currently, Debate Korea is an subsidiary organization of Discover Korea, and Debate Korea's activities are also currently underway.

Events hosted

Korea Economics Olympiad (KEO) 
Korea Economics Olympiad is a national pre-match for International Economics Olympics. It was hosted by Hankuk Academy of Foreign Studies and, in 2022, supported by The Korea Herald and Discover Korea.

The international economic Olympiad national team selection, KEO, will be conducted in two rounds, with the first round of economics-related paper tests and the second round of evaluation of individual business case presentation capabilities.

The Korea Herald CEO Award and the Korea Herald Editorial Director Award were awarded for the first prize winner and second prize winner, respectively, and the Discovery Korea Secretary-General Award was awarded for the third prize winner.

 Support for the operation of the 2022 3rd International Economic Olympiad national team selection

Hello NFT! Conference 
Discover Korea participated in the Hello NFT! conference held in June 2022 by Hello Web3, the largest NFT-related community in Korea, as an operational support and partner.

Secretary-General, Seokho Daniel Yoon participated as Co-Host, one of the organizers, and planned and operated an event attended by CEO Lee Doo-hee of Likelion, Yura Kim, co-founder of Shyost Squad, and CEO Choi Yoo-jin of Super Normal NFT as speakers.

Citations

Organizations based in Seoul
Gyeonggi Province
Politics of Korea
Non-profit corporations